Mary Frann (born Mary Frances Luecke, February 27, 1943 – September 23, 1998) was an American stage, film and television actress.

She is best known for her role as Bob Newhart's wife, Joanna Loudon, on the CBS sitcom Newhart, which aired from 1982 to 1990.

Early years
Born in St. Louis, Missouri, Frann was a child model and appeared in commercials for a local television station while she attended Nerinx Hall High School. At the age of 18, she was voted Missouri's "Junior Miss". She went on to win the 1961 national title of America's Junior Miss and earned a college scholarship to study drama at Northwestern University. As America's Junior Miss, she starred in a Jam Handy educational film (Prom: It's a Pleasure) extolling the etiquette and fun of the high school prom.  While attending Northwestern, Frann worked as a weather reporter for the NBC station in St. Louis. After a year, she dropped out of Northwestern and moved to Chicago where she co-hosted a morning show on an ABC affiliate. While working as a host, Frann worked in local theatre productions and began working in television and films. In 1964, Frann made her television debut in the Kraft Suspense Theatre episode "Once Upon a Savage Night", which was subsequently expanded into the TV movie Nightmare in Chicago. In 1966, Frann made her feature film debut in the low-budget musical drama Nashville Rebel, starring Waylon Jennings.

Career
After receiving an offer to host another morning show, Frann realized she wanted to pursue a career as an actress rather than a broadcaster. In 1968, she moved to Los Angeles where she stayed with her best friend, actress Joan Van Ark. Shortly after her arrival, Frann won a role on the NBC crime drama series My Friend Tony. After winning the role, Frann's agent told her that he felt she should change her name to something more appealing. Frann adopted the stage name "Jennifer Douglas", a name she picked from the phone book. After My Friend Tony was canceled after one season, Frann returned to using the name "Mary Frann" (which she had gone by since high school) as her professional name.

For the next five years, Frann continued to work in television and also worked in theatre in Los Angeles and New York. In 1974, she landed the role of Amanda Howard on the daytime soap opera Days of Our Lives. She would remain on the show until 1979. While on the series, Frann also made guest appearances on Quincy, M.E.; The Rockford Files; Fantasy Island; The Mary Tyler Moore Show and WKRP in Cincinnati. In 1978, Frann was nearly cast as Sue Ellen Ewing on the CBS prime-time drama Dallas. Producers later decided to cast actress Linda Gray. In 1982, she starred on the short-lived series King's Crossing with Linda Hamilton. That series was canceled after one season due to low ratings. Later that year, she landed her most memorable role as Joanna Loudon, the wife of Vermont inn owner Dick Loudon (Bob Newhart), in the sitcom Newhart. The series, which aired from October 1982 to May 1990, was a hit with audiences and was nominated for 25 Emmys and five Golden Globes. Shortly after filming the series finale, Frann was cast as "Clementine Duke" in the miniseries Lucky/Chances. The series was based on two of Jackie Collins' novels, Lucky and Chances. The role was a dramatic departure from Frann's work on Newhart and surprised audiences. She later told the Los Angeles Times, "I thought it would be outrageous, flamboyant, glamorous. I wanted to remind people that I was capable of playing many different roles."

During the run of Newhart, Frann continued acting in various projects. In 1985, she co-starred in the TV movie Gidget's Summer Reunion, and in 1988, she appeared in Dance 'til Dawn with Alyssa Milano, Christina Applegate and Kelsey Grammer. Frann also co-hosted the Miss USA and Miss Universe pageants of 1986 and 1987, and acted as hostess for the Macy's Thanksgiving Day Parade and the Rose Parade.

Her last acting role came in an episode of the series Beyond Belief: Fact or Fiction. Due to the sporadic airing of the series, the episode she was in, "The Curse of Hampton Manor", aired two years after her death.

Personal life
Frann married T.J. Escott in 1973.  They separated in 1982 and divorced the following year.

Frann was active as a volunteer fund-raiser and with several charitable works. She was a member of the Celebrity Action Council, a volunteer group of celebrity women who served the women's outreach of the Los Angeles Mission, for seven years. The night before her death, she had attended a meeting at the Mission.

Death
On September 23, 1998, Frann died in her sleep at her home in Beverly Hills, California. Her body was discovered by longtime boyfriend Jonathan Cookman, Jr. An autopsy determined she died of a heart attack, and found myocardial scars suggesting earlier undiagnosed infarction. Her remains are interred in the Holy Cross Cemetery in Culver City, California.

Selected filmography

References

External links
 
 
 
 
  

1943 births
1998 deaths
20th-century American actresses
Actresses from St. Louis
American beauty pageant winners
American child models
American film actresses
American musical theatre actresses
American soap opera actresses
American stage actresses
American television actresses
American television personalities
American women television personalities
Female models from Missouri
Burials at Holy Cross Cemetery, Culver City
Northwestern University School of Communication alumni